A zero-emission vehicle, or ZEV, is a vehicle that does not emit exhaust gas or other pollutants from the onboard source of power. The California definition also adds that this includes under any and all possible operational modes and conditions. This is because under cold-start conditions for example, internal combustion engines tend to produce the maximum amount of pollutants. In a number of countries and states, transport is cited as the main source of greenhouse gases (GHG) and other pollutants. The desire to reduce this is thus politically strong.

Terminology
Harmful pollutants to the health and the environment include particulates (soot), hydrocarbons, carbon monoxide, ozone, lead, and various oxides of nitrogen. Although not considered emission pollutants by the original California Air Resources Board (CARB) or U.S. Environmental Protection Agency (EPA) definitions, the most recent common use of the term also includes volatile organic compounds, several air toxics (most notably 1,3-Butadiene), and global pollutants such as carbon dioxide and other greenhouse gases.
 
Examples of zero-emission vehicle with different power sources can include muscle-powered vehicles such as bicycles, electric bicycles, and gravity racers.

Motor vehicles
Also other battery electric vehicles, which may shift emissions to the location where the electricity is generated (if the electricity comes from coal or natural gas power plants—as opposed to hydro-electric, wind power, solar power or nuclear power plants); and fuel cell vehicles powered by hydrogen, which may shift emissions to the location where the hydrogen is generated. It does not include hydrogen internal combustion engine vehicles because these do generate some emissions (although being near-emissionless). It also does not include vehicles running on 100% biofuel as these also emit exhaust gases, despite being carbon neutral overall.

Emissions from the manufacturing process are thus not included in this definition, and it has been argued that the emissions that are created during manufacture are currently of an order of magnitude that is comparable to the emissions that are created during a vehicle's operating lifetime.

However, these vehicles are in the early stages of their development; the manufacturing emissions may decrease by the development of technology, industry, shifting toward mass production and the ever-increasing use of renewable energy throughout the supply-chains.

History

Well-to-wheel emissions
The term zero-emissions or ZEV, as originally coined by the California Air Resources Board (CARB), refers only to motor vehicle emissions from the onboard source of power. Therefore, CARB's definition is accounting only for pollutants emitted at the point of the vehicle operation, and the clean air benefits are usually local because depending on the source of the electricity used to recharge the batteries, air pollutant emissions are shifted to the location of the electricity generation plants. In a broader perspective, the electricity used to recharge the batteries must be generated from renewable or clean sources such as wind, solar, hydroelectric, or nuclear power for ZEVs to have almost none or zero well-to-wheel emissions. In other words, if ZEVs are recharged from electricity generated by fossil fuel plants, they cannot be considered as zero emissions.

However, the spread of electrical-powered vehicles can help the development of systems for charging the EV batteries from excess electricity which cannot be used otherwise. For instance, electricity demand is lowest at night and the excess generated electricity at this time can be used for recharging the EVs' batteries. It's worth mentioning that renewable sources such as wind turbines or solar panels are less controllable in terms of the amount of generated electricity compared to fossil fuel power plants; most renewable energy sources are intermittent energy sources. Therefore, development of these resources will lead to excess energy which can be better used by development of EVs. Moreover, most EVs can benefit from regenerative brakes and other optimization systems which increases the energy efficiency in these vehicles.

Fuel cell vehicles (FCVs) can help even more in terms of the development of sustainable energy sources because these cars use hydrogen as their fuel. Compressed hydrogen can be used as an energy storage element, while electricity  must be stored in batteries. The hydrogen can be produced by electricity through electrolysis, and this electricity can come from green sources. Hydrogen can be produced in situ, e.g. excess at wind farm when the generated electricity is not needed, or it can be connected to the grid to use the excess electricity from the grid and produce electricity, e.g. at hydrogen pump stations. As a result, development of FCVs can be a big step toward sustainable development and reducing GHG emission in a long-term perspective.

Other countries have a different definition of ZEV, noteworthy the more recent inclusion of greenhouse gases, as many European rules now regulate CO2 emissions. CARB's role in regulating greenhouse gases began in 2004 based on the 2002 Pavley Act (AB 1493), but was blocked by lawsuits and by the EPA in 2007, by rejecting the required waiver. Additional responsibilities were granted to CARB by California's Global Warming Solutions Act of 2006 (AB 32), which includes the mandate to set low-carbon fuel standards.

As a result of an investigation into false advertising regarding "zero-emissions" claims, the Advertising Standards Authority (ASA) in the UK ruled in March 2010 to ban an advertisement from Renault UK regarding its "zero-emission vehicles" because the ad breached CAP (Broadcast) TV Code rules 5.1.1, 5.1.2 (Misleading advertising) and 5.2.1 (Misleading advertising- Evidence) and 5.2.6 (Misleading advertising-Environmental claims.)

Greenhouse gasses and other pollutant emissions are generated by vehicle manufacturing processes. The emissions from manufacturing are many factors larger than the emissions from tailpipes, even in gasoline engine vehicles. Most reports on ZEVs' impact to the climate do not take into account these manufacturing emissions, though over the lifetime of the car the emissions from manufacturing are relatively small.

Considering the current U.S. energy mix, a ZEV would produce an average 58% reduction in carbon dioxide emissions per mile driven. Given the current energy mixes in other countries, it has been predicted that such emissions would decrease by 40% in the U.K. and 19% in China.

Types of zero-emission vehicles

Apart from animal-powered and human-powered vehicles, battery electric vehicles (which include cars, aircraft and boats) also do not emit any of the above pollutants, nor any CO2 gases during use. This is a particularly important quality in densely populated areas, where the health of residents can be severely affected. However, the production of the fuels that power ZEVs, such as the production of hydrogen from fossil fuels, may produce more emissions per mile than the emissions produced from a conventional fossil fueled vehicle. A well-to-wheel life cycle assessment is necessary to understand the emissions implications associated with operating a ZEV.

Bicycles

In the mid-19th century, bicycle ownership became common (during the bike boom)—predating mass car ownership. In the 1960s, the Flying Pigeon bicycle became the single most popular mechanized vehicle on the planet. Some 210 million electric bikes are on the road in China.

Motor vehicles
Segway Personal Transporters are two-wheeled, self-balancing, battery-powered machines that are eleven times more energy-efficient than the average American car. Operating on two lithium-ion batteries, the Segway PT produces zero emissions during operation, and utilizes a negligible amount of electricity while charging via a standard wall outlet.

Marine

Wind-powered land vehicles operating on wind exist (using wind turbines and kites). For boats and other watercraft, regular and special sails (as rotorsails, wing sails, turbo sails, skysails) exist that can propel them without emissions.

Lloyd's Register has partnered with a consortium of companies to develop an ammonia-fuelled ship.

Air

An electric aircraft is an aircraft powered by electric motors. Electricity may be supplied by a variety of methods including batteries, ground power cables, solar cells, ultracapacitors, fuel cells and power beaming. Between 2015 and 2016, Solar Impulse 2 completed a circumnavigation of the Earth using solar power.

Incentives

Subsidies for public transport
Japanese public transport is being driven in the direction of zero emissions due to growing environmental concern. Honda has launched a conceptual bus which features exercise machines to the rear of the vehicle to generate kinetic energy used for propulsion.

Due to the stop-start nature of idling in public transport, regenerative braking may be a possibility for public transport systems of the future.

Subsidies for development of electric cars
In an attempt to curb carbon emissions as well as noise pollution in South African cities, the South African Department of Science & Technology (DST), as well as other private investments, have made US$5 million available through the Innovation Fund for the development of the Joule. The Joule is a five-seater car, planned to be released in 2014. However the company ceased trading in 2012.

Low and zero emission zones
Several cities have implemented low-emission zones.

See also

List of electric cars currently available
Coda Automotive
Electric rickshaw
GM EV1
Green vehicle
Human–electric hybrid vehicle
Hybrid vehicle
Hydrogen vehicle
Low-carbon fuel standard (LCFS)
Low-emission vehicle
Miles per gallon gasoline equivalent
Optimal Energy Joule
Partial zero-emissions vehicle
Personal automated transport
Super-ultra-low-emission vehicle (SULEV)
Shweeb
Renault Z.E.
Tesla, Inc.
Tier (emission standard)
Ultra-low-emission vehicle (ULEV)
Who Killed the Electric Car?, a documentary
Zero-carbon city
Zero emission
ZENN (Zero Emission, No Noise)

References

External links
 Official California site on ZEVs and PZEVs

 
Appropriate technology
Sustainable transport